The Adventure Racing World Series (ARWS) is an endurance racing season where adventure racing teams compete in a range of disciplines including, for example, navigation, trekking, mountain biking, paddling and climbing.

Format 
Mixed gender teams of four competitors compete in a series of up to a dozen non-stop, multi-day expedition adventure races held in locations spread across the globe.  These races culminate in the staging of the Adventure Racing World Championships, the winner of which is crowned World Champions.

The competition's format provides that each of the individual events of the World Series function as a qualifier for the World Championships. The top two finishing teams in each event secure the opportunity to compete in the World Championships. The field of event winners and second place getters is then supplemented by the reigning world champions, who are given the right to defend their title, and a selection of wild card entrants round out the number of starters.

The actual World Championship race rotates each year.  One of the qualifying events is singled out and designated as the World Championship event and this event provides a dramatic conclusion to the end of the World Series racing season.

In addition to the World Championship race, points are assigned to results from each of the qualifying races in the series to determine a World Ranking.  Points are allocated on a team's best two results in a calendar year over a two-year period (with heavier weighting given to World Championship results), with the ranking cycle periodically refreshed every 4–6 months.

History 
The Adventure Racing World Championship was the brainchild of Geoff Hunt and Pascale Lorre, long-time adventure racers who sought to "lend badly needed structure to the sport". Hunt and Lorre's vision was first brought to fruition in Switzerland in 2001 where 41 teams contested the Discovery Channel World Championship Adventure Race with the controversy-plagued event eventually won by Finland's Team Nokia Adventure. A team from New Zealand, including Kathy Lynch, came second that year, US Team GoLite (became Nike ACG the following year) was 3rd.

After a two-year hiatus the Adventure Racing World Championships was next held in Canada in 2004 and has subsequently been held every year since.

In 2011 management of the race was passed to the Australian event management company Geocentric Outdoors. The 2011 World Championships - won by Thule Adventure Team - were staged at the XPD Expedition Race in Tasmania, Australia, where 90 teams drawn from 21 countries made for the largest starting field in the event's history. This is testament to the fact that the World Series hosts some of the best expedition adventure racing teams in the world and "continues to grow and become more prominent". Geocentric Outdoors also instigated a number of new initiatives for the world series, including standardized equipment lists and logistics across the races, restrictions on mixed nationality teams at the World Championship race each year as well as the introduction of the World Series ranking system.  These initiatives have encouraged larger international fields at the various races by lowering the logistical barriers for participation and rewarding participation in multiple events.

In 2012, the World Championships was held at Raid in France and were won by Team Seagate from New Zealand.  The title of World Champion returned to the Thule Adventure Team at Costa Rica in 2013, before again being reclaimed by Team Seagate in Ecuador in 2014.  Despite having never won a World Championship, Spanish team Columbia Vidaraid held the number-one position in the World Series ranking through 2014 and 2015 due to their string of wins in World Series qualifying races in addition to their second-place finishes in the 2013 and 2014 World Championships. Seagate regained the top position in the rankings in 2016 after dominating at the incredibly demanding 2015 World Championships, held in the Pantanal in Brazil, as well as in the Shoalhaven area of Australia in 2016.

In the absence of a world governing body, and after the cessation of the dominant world level events in the mid 2000s like the Raid Gauloises (Raid World Series and World Championships) Eco-Challenge, Primal Quest, and Outdoor Quest, Geocentric's ARWS and ARWC remained as the only series in the sport.

World Championship results

2015 Adventure Racing World Series

2016 Adventure Racing World Series

2017 Adventure Racing World Series

2018 Adventure Racing World Series

2019 Adventure Racing World Series

Canceled due to 2019 Sri Lanka Easter bombings

2020 Adventure Racing World Series

Canceled races (due to COVID-19):||Expedition Africa, Adventure Race Malaysia, ITERA, Raid in France, Adventure Race Croatia, Expedition Oregon, PC 12 AR, XPD Adventure Race, Nordic Islands AR, Huairasinchi, Expedición Guaraní World Championships

2021 Adventure Racing World Series

Canceled races (due to COVID-19):||Expedition Africa, Adventure Race Malaysia, ITERA, Raid in France, Adventure Race Croatia, Patagonia Raid

References

Bibliography
Swift E.M. "Chilling Debut", sportsillustrated.cnn.com, 2001-10-17, retrieved 2011-11-19
AG Outdoor "2011 Adventure Race World Championships", australiangeographic.com.au/outdoor, retrieved 2011-11-19
Explore Compete Live "Raid in France to hold 2012 Adventure Race World Championships", explorecompetelive.com, 2011-1-18, retrieved 2011-11-19
Sleepmonsters "Australian company takes over Adventure Racing World Series management", sleepmonsters.com, 2011-2-22, retrieved 2011-11-19
The Free Dictionary "ARWS acronym", retrieved 2011-11-19
Science Daily "Ultra-Endurance Athletes Suffer No Cardiac Fatigue, Even After Six Days of Non-Stop Exercise, Swedish Study Finds", sciencedaily.com, 2010-8-31, retrieved 2011-11-19
Scotland "Adventure Racing World Championships 2007", retrieved 2011-11-19
Xtreme Sport "Orionhealth.com from New Zealand are crowned the 2008 Adventure Racing World Champions", xtremesports4u.com, 2008-10-11, retrieved 2011-11-19
Xtreme Sport "England is triumphant! The XPD Portugal World Champions are British – congratulations", xtremesports4u.com,2009-11-16, retrieved 2011-11-19
Adventure Junkie "Gold Rush Mother Lode adventure race joins AR World Series" theadventureblog.com, 2011-4-25, retrieved 2011-1-19
Sleepmonsters  "Thule Adventure Team – Winning the World Championships", xwww.sleepmonsters.com, retrieved 2011-12-01

External links

Adventure Racing World Series - Includes 2011 World Series race results
Sleepmonsters - Includes World Championship results
XPD Expedition Race
RAID in France
Gold Rush Mother Lode

Alpine Quest
Adventure racing